Barbara Gallavotti (Turin, December 21, 1968) is an Italian biologist, television author and science communicator.

Biography and career 
Born in Turin but raised in Rome, Gallavotti completed her undergraduate studies in 1986. In 1993 she graduated in biology, with a specialization in genetics and molecular biology, from the University of Sapienza University of Rome, and in 1994, she passed the qualifying examination for the profession of biologist.

After starting her career as a biologist, Gallavotti decided to devote herself to the popularization of science and began her collaboration with Galileo, the first Italian online journal dedicated to the themes of scientific research and technology. Gallavotti has become well known in the field of popular science, writing books for children and young people on various scientific topics. She works as an author of television programs, having started with  hosted by Alberto Angela in 2000. She continued with the children's program Hit Science in 2004 on Rai Tre. In 2010 Gallavotti collaborated with the program , hosted first by Alex Zanardi and then by Massimiliano Ossini, becoming a correspondent in 2013.

From 2007 to 2008, Gallavotti held the position of temporary director of the Master in Communication of Science and Technology at the University of Tor Vergata, in Rome, and in 2009, she taught a course in communication sciences as adjunct professor at the Faculty of Communication Sciences of the Roma Tre University.

Gallavotti has written several books, oriented in particular to a young audience, including: Il sistema solare, L'Universo, La vita sulla Terra. In May 2019 she co-authored the book Le grandi epidemie - come difendersi (tr.

Winner of numerous awards and prizes, including the Capo d'Orlando Award for multimedia communication which she received in 2013, Gallavotti is also an advisor for the scientific coordination of the National Museum of Science and Technology "Leonardo da Vinci" in Milan.

Published works

References 

Year of birth missing (living people)
Italian biologists
Italian television journalists
Mass media people from Turin
Sapienza University of Rome alumni
Scientists from Turin
Scientists from Rome
Mass media people from Rome